This is a list of high schools in the state of Alabama, United States.

Autauga County 
Billingsley High School, Billingsley
Marbury High School, Marbury

Prattville

Autauga Academy
Autauga County Technology Center
Prattville High School

Baldwin County 

Gulf Shores High School, Gulf Shores
Orange Beach High School, Orange Beach
Spanish Fort High School, Spanish Fort

Bay Minette

Baldwin County High School
North Baldwin Center for Technology

Daphne

Bayside Academy  
Daphne High School

Fairhope

Bayshore Christian School 
Fairhope High School
St. Michael Catholic High School

Foley

Foley High School
Snook Christian Academy

Robertsdale

Central Christian School 
Robertsdale High School
South Baldwin Center for Technology

Barbour County 
Barbour County High School, Clayton

Eufaula

Eufaula High School
The Lakeside School

Bibb County

Centreville

Bibb County High School
Cahawba Christian Academy

West Blocton

Bibb County Career Academy
West Blocton High School

Blount County 

Hayden High School, Hayden
Locust Fork High School, Locust Fork

Blountsville

J.B. Pennington High School
Susan Moore High School

Cleveland

Blount County Career Technical Center 
Cleveland High School

Oneonta

Appalachian School
Oneonta High School

Bullock County

Union Springs

Bullock County High School
Bullock County Career Technical Center
Conecuh Springs Christian School

Butler County 

Georgiana School, Georgiana
McKenzie School, McKenzie

Greenville

Fort Dale Academy  
Greenville High School

Calhoun County 

Alexandria High School, Alexandria
Ohatchee High School, Ohatchee
Piedmont High School, Piedmont
Sacred Heart of Jesus Catholic School, Fort McClellan
Weaver High School, Weaver

Anniston

Anniston High School
The Donoho School
Faith Christian School  
Saks High School
Walter Wellborn High School
White Plains High School

Jacksonville

Calhoun County Career Academy 
Jacksonville Christian Academy  
Jacksonville High School
Pleasant Valley High School

Oxford

Oxford High School
Trinity Christian Academy

Chambers County 
Valley High School, Valley

Lafayette

Chambers Academy 
Lafayette High School

Lanett

Lanett High School
Springwood School

Cherokee County 

Cedar Bluff School, Cedar Bluff
Gaylesville School, Gaylesville
Sand Rock School, Sand Rock
Spring Garden School, Spring Garden

Centre

Cherokee County Career & Technology Center
Cherokee County High School

Chilton County 

Chilton County High School, Clanton
Thorsby High School, Thorsby
Verbena High School, Verbena

Jemison

Chilton Christian Academy 
Jemison High School

Maplesville

Isabella High School
Maplesville High School

Choctaw County 

South Choctaw Academy, Toxey
Southern Choctaw High School, Gilbertown

Butler

Choctaw County High School
Patrician Academy

Clarke County 
Thomasville High School, Thomasville

Grove Hill

Clarke County High School
Clarke Preparatory School

Jackson

Jackson Academy
Jackson High School

Clay County 
Central High School of Clay County, Lineville

Ashland

Clay County Christian Academy 
First Assembly Christian School

Cleburne County 
Ranburne High School, Ranburne

Heflin

Cleburne County High School
Cleburne County Career Technical School

Coffee County 

Elba High School, Elba
Enterprise High School, Enterprise
Kinston High School, Kinston
New Brockton High School, New Brockten
Zion Chapel High School, Jack

Colbert County 

Cherokee High School, Cherokee
Colbert County High School, Leighton
Sheffield High School, Sheffield

Muscle Shoals

Muscle Shoals Career Academy 
Muscle Shoals High School

Tuscumbia

Colbert Heights High School
Deshler High School/Career Center

Conecuh County

Evergreen

Hillcrest High School
Sparta Academy

Coosa County 
Central High School, Rockford

Covington County 

Florala High School, Florala
Opp High School, Opp
Red Level High School, Red Level

Andalusia

Andalusia High School
Pleasant Home School
Straughn High School

Crenshaw County 

Brantley High School, Brantley
Highland Home High School, Highland Home

Luverne

Crenshaw Christian Academy 
Luverne High School

Cullman County 

Cold Springs High School, Bremen
Good Hope High School, Good Hope
Hanceville High School, Hanceville
Holly Pond High School, Holly Pond
Vinemont High School, South Vinemont

Cullman

Cullman Christian School 
Fairview High School
St. Bernard Preparatory School
West Point High School

Dale County 

Ariton School, Ariton
Carroll High School, Ozark
Dale County High School, Midland City
Daleville High School, Daleville
G. W. Long High School, Skipperville

Dallas County 

Dallas County High School, Plantersville
Keith Middle-High School, Orrville

Selma
 
Cathedral Christian Academy 
Dallas County Career Technical Center
Ellwood Christian Academy
Meadowview Christian School 
Morgan Academy
Selma High School
Southside High School

Dekalb County 

Collinsville High School, Collinsville
Crossville High School, Crossville
Fort Payne High School, Fort Payne
Fyffe High School, Fyffe
Geraldine High School, Geraldine
Ider High School, Ider
Sylvania High School, Sylvania
Valley Head High School, Valley Head

Rainsville

Cornerstone Christian Academy 
DeKalb County Technology Center 
Plainview High School

Elmore County 

Edgewood Academy, Elmore
Elmore County High School, Eclectic
Holtville High School, Deatsville
Tallassee High School, Tallassee
Wetumpka High School, Wetumpka

Millbrook

New Life Christian Academy
Stanhope Elmore High School
Victory Christian Academy

Escambia County 

Flomaton High School, Flomaton
W. S. Neal High School, East Brewton

Brewton

Escambia Career Readiness Center
T. R. Miller High School

Atmore

Atmore Christian School 
Escambia Academy
Escambia County High School
Temple Christian Academy

Etowah County 

Glencoe High School, Glencoe
Hokes Bluff High School, Hokes Bluff
Sardis High School, Sardis
Southside High School, Southside
West End High School, Walnut Grove
Westbrook Christian School, Rainbow City

Attalla

Etowah County Career Technical Center
Etowah High School

Gadsden

Coosa Christian School 
Episcopal Day School 
Gadsden City High School
Gaston High School

Fayette County 

Berry High School, Berry
Fayette County High School, Fayette
Hubbertville School, Hubertville

Franklin County 

Phil Campbell High School, Phil Campbell
Red Bay High School, Red Bay
Vina High School, Vina

Russellville

Belgreen High School
Franklin County Career Technical Center
Russellville High School 
Tharptown High School

Geneva County 

Geneva High School, Geneva
Geneva County High School, Hartford
Samson High School, Samson
Slocomb High School, Slocomb

Greene County 
 Greene County High School, Eutaw

Hale County 

Hale County High School, Moundville
Southern Academy, Greensboro

Henry County 
Headland High School, Headland

Abbeville

Abbeville Christian Academy
Abbeville High School

Houston County 

Ashford High School, Ashford
Cottonwood High School, Cottonwood
Houston County High School, Columbia
Rehobeth High School, Rehobeth
Wicksburg High School, Wicksburg

Dothan

Dothan High School
Dothan Technology Center
Emmanuel Christian School 
Houston Academy
Houston County Career Academy
Northside Methodist Academy
Northview High School
Providence Christian School

Jackson County 

Earnest Pruett Center of Technology, Hollywood
Mountain View Christian Academy, Bryant
North Jackson High School, Stevenson
North Sand Mountain School, Higdon
Pisgah High School, Pisgah
Section High School, Section
Woodville High School, Woodville, Alabama

Scottsboro

Scottsboro High School
Skyline High School

Jefferson County 

Center Point High School, Center Point
Clay-Chalkville High School, Clay
Corner High School, Dora
Fultondale High School, Fultondale
Hewitt-Trussville High School, Trussville
Homewood High School, Homewood
Hueytown High School, Hueytown
Leeds High School, Leeds
McAdory High School, McCalla
Midfield High School, Midfield
Minor High School, Adamsville
Mortimer Jordan High School, Morris
Mountain Brook High School, Mountain Brook
Pinson Valley High School, Pinson
Pleasant Grove High School, Pleasant Grove
Tarrant High School, Tarrant
Vestavia Hills High School, Vestavia Hills

Bessemer

Bessemer Academy
Bessemer Center for Technology
Bessemer City High School
Oak Grove High School

Birmingham

A. H. Parker High School
Alabama School of Fine Arts
Altamont School
 Banks Academy  
Carver High School
Cornerstone Christian Schools 
Glen Iris Baptist School 
Holy Family Cristo Rey High School
Huffman High School
Islamic Academy of Alabama  
Jackson-Olin High School
John Carroll Catholic High School
Ramsay High School
Rock City Preparatory Christian School 
Spring Valley School 
Wenonah High School
Woodlawn High School

Fairfield

Fairfield High Preparatory School
Restoration Academy

Gardendale

Gardendale High School
Tabernacle Christian School

Hoover

Hoover Christian School 
Hoover High School

Irondale

Jefferson County International Baccalaureate School
Shades Valley High School

Lamar County 

Lamar County High School, Vernon 
South Lamar School, Millport
Sulligent High School, Sulligent

Lauderdale County 

Lauderdale County High School, Rogersville
Lexington High School, Lexington
Waterloo High School, Waterloo

Florence

Central High School
Florence Freshman Center
Florence High School
Mars Hill Bible School
Rogers High School
Shoals Christian School

Killen

Allen Thornton Career Tech Center
Brooks High School

Lawrence County 

East Lawrence High School, Trinity
Hatton High School, Town Creek

Moulton

Lawrence County Career Technical Center
Lawrence County High School

Lee County 

Beulah High School, Beulah, AL
Loachapoka High School, Loachapoka

Auburn

Auburn High School
Lee-Scott Academy

Opelika

Beauregard High School
The Oaks School 
Opelika High School

Smiths Station

Glenwood School
Smiths Station Freshman Center
Smiths Station High School

Limestone County 

Ardmore High School, Ardmore
Elkmont High School, Elkmont
Tanner High School, Tanner
West Limestone High School, Lester

Athens

Athens Bible School 
Athens High School
Clements High School
East Limestone High School
Limestone County Career Technical Center
Lindsay Lane Christian Academy

Lowndes County 

Calhoun High School, Letohatchee
Central High School, Hayneville
Lowndes Academy, Lowndesboro

Macon County 

Booker T. Washington High School, Tuskegee
Notasulga High School, Notasulga

Madison County 

Buckhorn High School, New Market
Hazel Green High School, Hazel Green
Madison County High School, Gurley
New Hope High School, New Hope
Sparkman High School, Harvest

Huntsville

Public

Columbia High School
Grissom High School
Huntsville High School
Jemison High School
Lee High School
Madison County Career Tech Center
New Century Technology High School
Randolph School

Private

Huntsville Christian Academy 
Oakwood Adventist Academy
Pope John Paul II Catholic High School
Union Chapel Christian Academy 
Valley Fellowship Christian Academy

Madison

Bob Jones High School
James Clemens High School
Madison Academy

Marengo County 

Amelia Love Johnson High School, Thomaston
Linden High School, Linden
Marengo High School, Dixons Mills
Sweet Water High School, Sweet Water

Demopolis

Demopolis High School
John Essex High School

Marion County 

Brilliant High School, Brilliant
Hackleburg High School, Hackleburg
Hamilton High School, Hamilton
Marion County High School, Guin
Phillips High School, Bear Creek
Winfield High School, Winfield

Marshall County 

Arab High School, Arab
Boaz High School, Boaz
Douglas High School, Douglas
Kate Duncan Smith DAR School, Grant

Albertville

Albertville High School
Asbury High School
Marshall Christian School

Guntersville

Brindlee Mountain High School
Guntersville High School
Marshall Technical School

Mobile County 

Chickasaw City High School, Chickasaw
Citronelle High School, Citronelle
Mary G. Montgomery High School, Semmes
Mattie T. Blount High School, Eight Mile
Saraland High School, Saraland
Satsuma High School, Satsuma

Irvington

Alma Bryant High School
Bryant Career Tech Center

Mobile

Public

Alabama School of Mathematics and Science
Augusta Evans School
B.C. Rain High School
Baker High School
Davidson High School
John L. LeFlore Magnet High School of Advanced Communication and Fine Performing Arts
Murphy High School
Williamson High School

Private

Al-Iman Academy of Mobile 
Cottage Hill Christian Academy 
Faith Academy
Government Street Christian School 
McGill-Toolen Catholic High School
Mobile Christian School 
St. Luke's Episcopal School 
St. Paul's Episcopal School
UMS-Wright Preparatory School

Prichard

Faulkner Career Tech Center
Vigor High School

Theodore

Lighthouse Baptist Academy 
Theodore High School

Monroe County 

Excel High School, Excel
J. F. Shields High School, Beatrice
J. U. Blacksher School, Uriah

Monroeville

Monroe Academy
Monroe County High School

Montgomery

Public

Booker T. Washington Magnet High School
Brewbaker Technology Magnet High School
Dr. Percy L. Julian High School
George Washington Carver High School
Jefferson Davis High School
Lanier High School
Loveless Academic Magnet Program
McIntrye Comprehensive Academy
Montgomery Preparatory Academy for Career Technologies
Park Crossing High School

Private

Alabama Christian Academy
Montgomery Academy
Montgomery Catholic Preparatory School
Saint James School
Trinity Presbyterian School

Morgan County 

Albert P. Brewer High School, Somerville
Danville High School, Danville
Falkville High School, Falkville
Hartselle High School, Hartselle
Priceville High School, Priceville
West Morgan High School, Trinity

Decatur

Austin High School
Decatur High School

Perry County 
Robert C. Hatch, Uniontown

Marion

Francis Marion School

Pickens County 

 Aliceville High School, Aliceville
 Gordo High School, Gordo
 Pickens County High School, Reform

Pike County 

Goshen High School, Goshen
Pike County High School, Brundidge

Troy

Charles Henderson High School

Randolph County 

 Handley High School, Roanoke
 Randolph County High School, Wedowee
 Wadley High School, Wadley
 Woodland High School, Woodland

Russell County 

Central High School, Phenix City
Russell County High School, Seale

St. Clair County 

Ragland School, Ragland
St. Clair County High School, Odenville
Springville High School, Springville

Ashville

Ashville High School
Eden Career Technical Center

Moody

Moody High School
Virtual Preparatory Academy

Pell City

Pell City High School

Shelby County 

Calera High School, Calera
Chelsea High School, Chelsea
Coosa Valley Academy Harpersville
Indian Springs School, Indian Springs Village
Montevallo High School, Montevallo
Pelham High School, Pelham
Spain Park High School, Hoover
Vincent High School,  Vincent

Alabaster

Evangel Christian School
Thompson High School

Birmingham

Briarwood Christian School
Oak Mountain High School

Columbiana

Shelby County Career/Tech Education Center
Shelby County High School

Helena

Helena High School

Sumter County 
Sumter Central High School, York

Talladega County 

 Childersburg High School, Childersburg
 Lincoln High School, Lincoln
 Munford High School, Munford
 Winterboro High School, Alpine

Sylacauga

 B. B. Comer Memorial High School
 Fayetteville High School
 Sylacauga High School

Talladega

Talladega County Central High School
Talladega Career/Technical Center
 Talladega High School

Tallapoosa County 

Benjamin Russell High School, Alexander City
Dadeville High School, Dadeville
Horseshoe Bend High School, New Site
Reeltown High School, Notasulga

Camp Hill

Edward Bell Career Tech Center
Southern Preparatory Academy

Tuscaloosa County 

Brookwood High School, Brookwood
Holt High School, Holt
Sipsey Valley High School, Romulus

Cottondale

Paul W. Bryant High School

Tuscaloosa

American Christian Academy
Central High School
Hillcrest High School
Holy Spirit Catholic School
Northridge High School
Tuscaloosa Academy
Tuscaloosa Career & Technology Academy

Northport

Northside High School
Tuscaloosa County High School

Walker County 

Carbon Hill High School, Carbon Hill
Cordova High School, Cordova
Curry High School, Curry
Dora High School,  Dora
Oakman High School, Oakman
Sumiton Christian School, Sumiton

Jasper

Jasper High School
Walker County Center of Technology

Washington County 

Fruitdale High School, Fruitdale
Leroy High School, Leroy
McIntosh High School, McIntosh
Millry High School, Millry

Chatom

Washington County Career Technical Center
Washington County High School

Wilcox County

Camden

Camden School of Arts & Technology
Wilcox Academy
Wilcox Central High School

Winston County 

Addison High School, Addison
Haleyville High School, Haleyville
Lynn High School, Lynn
Meek High School, Arley

Double Springs

Winston County High School
Winston County Technical Center

References

Sources 

Schools

Alabama